Marcel Tremblay (born 12 June 1965) is a Canadian speed skater. He competed in the men's 1000 metres event at the 1988 Winter Olympics.

References

External links
 

1965 births
Living people
Canadian male speed skaters
Olympic speed skaters of Canada
Speed skaters at the 1988 Winter Olympics
Sportspeople from Sherbrooke
20th-century Canadian people